Stara Wieś Pierwsza  is a village in the administrative district of Gmina Bychawa, within Lublin County, Lublin Voivodeship, in eastern Poland.

The village has a population of 486.

References

Villages in Lublin County